"Dirty Mind" is a song by UK-based pop act Shakespears Sister, released as the fifth and final single from their debut studio album Sacred Heart by FFRR Records. The song, originally produced by Richard Feldman, was completely re-recorded and remixed by Duncan Bridgeman for its release as a single, and includes a rap by Marcella Detroit.

Track listing 

7" single
"Dirty Mind" (1990 Version) — 4:11
"Dirty Mind" — 4:04

CD single
"Dirty Mind" (1990 Version) — 4:11
"Electric Moon" — 3:28
"Dirty Mind" (Extended 1990 Version) — 6:29

12" single / Cassette
"Dirty Mind" (Extended 1990 Version) — 6:29
"Dirty Mind" — 4:10
"Electric Moon" — 3:25

12" E-Zee Remix single
"Dirty Mind" (E-Zee Remix)
"Run Silent" (Revolution Mix)

Charts

References 

1990 singles
Shakespears Sister songs
Songs written by Siobhan Fahey
Songs written by Marcella Detroit
Songs written by Richard Feldman (songwriter)
1989 songs
FFRR Records singles